Bananera Airport  is an airport serving the city of Morales in Izabal Department, Guatemala.

The runway is within the city.

See also
 
 
 Transport in Guatemala
 List of airports in Guatemala

References

External links
 OurAirports - Bananera
 OpenStreetMap - Bananera
 SkyVector - Bananera Airport
 FallingRain - Bananera
 

Airports in Guatemala
Izabal Department